Henry David Erskine was the Dean of Ripon from 1847 until his death on 27 July 1859. He was the second son of Thomas Erskine, 1st Baron Erskine and his wife Frances née Moore. He married Lady Mary Harriet Dawson, daughter of John Dawson, 1st Earl of Portarlington on 4 May 1813.

References

Deans of Ripon
Younger sons of barons
Year of birth unknown
1859 deaths